Fred Berger may refer to:
 Fred Berger (actor) (1894–?), Austrian-born actor in British films
 Fred Berger (politician) (1932–2009), Canadian politician
 Fred Berger (producer) (born 1981), American film producer
 Frédéric Berger (born 1964), French former ski jumper